pardon was a German satirical magazine, which appeared biweekly from 1962 to 1982. It was published to criticise the conservative situation of the Adenauer era.

pardon worked in a combination of politics and humour, information and satire, philosophy and graphics. Commentators included Freimut Duve and Robert Jungk. Wilhelm Genazino was a member of the editorial staff for some time.

History

1961 to 1971 
Loriot designed the first title page. Among the first writers were Werner Finck, Wolfgang Bauer, Hans Magnus Enzensberger, Martin Walser and Günter Grass. pardon was successful from the start. The FAZ summarised later that pardon influenced the zeitgeist of its era, leaving a mark on post-war history ("Pardon hat unter Nikels Leitung mit dessen literarisch-satirischem Spürsinn 18 Jahre lang Einfluss auf den Zeitgeist der Republik genommen – eine markante Phase der Nachkriegsgeschichte.") pardon was for a while the most popular satirical magazine in Europe, reaching more than 1.5 million regular readers then. The politician Franz Josef Strauß began 18 legal cases against the magazine, and lost them all.

Reorganisation 
In 1971, Erich Bärmeier left the team. Several authors disliked a change to less satire and more film and travel topics. Some of them founded the group Neue Frankfurter Schule which published the Titanic magazine from 1979. Nikel won authors such as Elke Heidenreich and Peter Härtling, among others. Nikel ended his tenure in October 1980, leaving the pardon license to Hermann L. Gremliza of konkret, with chief editor . Their first issue appeared in May 1982, but the magazine was discontinued in July that year. Revivals have been tried but were shortlived.

Literature 
 : Die schärfsten Kritiker der Elche in Wort und Strich und Bild. Alexander Fest, Berlin 2001, .

References

External links
 Homepage of Johannes Hans A. Nikel
 Oliver Maria Schmitt: Das Super-Sexy-Satire-Spritzpistolen-Schwebe-Blatt. 2001, Titanic

1962 establishments in West Germany
1982 disestablishments in  Germany
Biweekly magazines published in Germany
Defunct magazines published in Germany
German-language magazines
Magazines established in 1962
Magazines disestablished in 1982
Mass media in Frankfurt
Satirical magazines published in Germany